Artur Vallner (18 October 1887 Tallinn – 1939 (or 4 November 1937)) was an Estonian educator and politician.

In 1917 he was Chairman of Estonian Provincial Assembly.

References

1887 births
1930s deaths
Estonian politicians
Estonian communists
Estonian schoolteachers
Academic staff of Saint Petersburg State University
Members of the Estonian Provincial Assembly
Great Purge victims from Estonia
Politicians from Tallinn